The wrestling competition at the 2003 Pan American Games was held from August 6–8, 2003 in Santo Domingo, Dominican Republic. This was the first edition of the Pan American Games to include women's wrestling.

Medal table

Men's events

Men's Freestyle

Men's Greco-Roman

Women's events

Women's Freestyle

See also
 Wrestling at the 2004 Summer Olympics

References

 Sports 123

Events at the 2003 Pan American Games
2003
Pan
Wrestling in the Dominican Republic